The 2014–15 campaign was an historic season for Walsall, with the club making its first ever appearance at Wembley in the final of the Football League Trophy. The Saddlers’ league form was less impressive, ending the season with a 14th place finish.

The road to Wembley
Having received a bye to the Northern section second round, Walsall started their Football League Trophy campaign with a trip to Rochdale. Despite having been beaten 4–0 in the corresponding league fixture a few weeks earlier, the Saddlers won 1–0 with a goal from French striker Mathieu Manset, his only goal for the club. 

The quarter finals saw Sheffield United defeated by the same scoreline courtesy of a Romaine Sawyers goal. Travelling to Tranmere for the semi-final, the Saddlers trailed 2–0 before hitting back to draw 2–2 and win on penalties.

That set up a Northern section final with Preston North End. An inspired goalkeeping performance from Richard O'Donnell and late goals from Anthony Forde and Tom Bradshaw secured a 2–0 away win in the first leg. A goalless draw back at the Bescot was enough to confirm Walsall’s first appearance at Wembley in the club’s 127-year history, prompting wild celebrations from fans and players alike. 

The Saddlers would face runaway League One leaders Bristol City in the final, with the clash generating major excitement in the town. More than 30,000 Walsall fans made the trip to London, forming part of a crowd over 72,000 strong. However, the Saddlers were comfortably beaten on the day suffering a 2–0 defeat.

The league season
Major moves in the summer transfer market saw the departure of captain and fan favourite Andy Butler who left for Sheffield United, while top scorer Craig Westcarr was surprisingly released. Incomings included defender James O’Connor and attackers Tom Bradshaw and Jordan Cook.

The season got off to a poor start with the club failing to win any of its first six league fixtures. A first three points of the season was finally achieved with a 3–1 win over Preston, with Butler surprisingly returning to the club on a one-month loan deal to cover a defensive injury crisis. 

However, the Saddlers continued to struggle with a 1–0 defeat to Crawley in October meaning the club had won just four of its last 32 league fixtures stretching back to January 2014. Despite this poor form, the club stuck with manager Dean Smith, who followed the Crawley loss with a seven game unbeaten run and progress in the Football League Trophy. 

The form of Bradshaw was a major plus-point, with the young striker hitting 15 goals in his first 22 games for the club. Otherwise, Walsall struggled for goals and a run of just one win in 12 games between January and March left the Saddlers two points above the relegation zone with six games left to play. 

However, three wins in the next five games ensured survival was achieved comfortably. Importantly, Bradshaw regained his early season form, hitting four goals after enduring a seven-game drought. 

The season ended on a sour note with an 8-2 thrashing away at champions Bristol City. That left the Saddlers in 14th, ten points off the playoffs and nine clear of relegation. It was a low scoring season for the club, managing only 50 goals in 46 league games.

Match details

Pre-season

League One

League table

Matches
The fixtures for the 2014–15 season were announced on 18 June 2014 at 9am.

FA Cup

The draw for the first round of the FA Cup was made on 27 October 2014.

League Cup

The draw for the first round was made on 17 June 2014 at 10am. Walsall were drawn away to Southend United.

Football League Trophy

Transfers

In

Out

Loans in

Loans out

Squad statistics
Source:

Numbers in parentheses denote appearances as substitute.
Players with squad numbers struck through and marked  left the club during the playing season.
Players with names in italics and marked * were on loan from another club for the whole of their season with Walsall.
Players listed with no appearances have been in the matchday squad but only as unused substitutes.
Key to positions: GK – Goalkeeper; DF – Defender; MF – Midfielder; FW – Forward

References

Walsall F.C. seasons
Walsall